Mogrus mirabilis is a species of jumping spider in the genus Mogrus that lives in Yemen. The female was first described in 1994 and the male in 2004.

References

Salticidae
Spiders described in 1994
Spiders of the Arabian Peninsula